Grant Reibel (born 4 March 1980) is an Australian former rugby league footballer who played for the North Queensland Cowboys in the National Rugby League.

Playing career
A Bowen Tigers junior, Reibel joined the North Queensland Cowboys as a teenager. In 1998, he represented the Junior Kangaroos and Queensland under-19 sides. 

In Round 12 of the 2000 NRL season, he made his NRL debut in the Cowboys' 18–8 win over the Wests Tigers. After playing one more NRL game in 2000, he didn't return to first grade until the 2002 season, where he played three games. Reibel left the Cowboys at the end of the 2003 season to join the Royal Australian Air Force.

Statistics

NRL
 Statistics are correct to the end of the 2002 season

References

1980 births
Living people
Military personnel from Queensland
Royal Australian Air Force personnel
Australian rugby league players
North Queensland Cowboys players
Rugby league props
Rugby league players from Queensland